Castel di Lama is a comune (municipality) in the Province of Ascoli Piceno in the Italian region Marche, located about  south of Ancona and about  east of Ascoli Piceno.

Castel di Lama borders the following municipalities: Appignano del Tronto, Ascoli Piceno, Castorano, Offida.

The name comes from a mediaeval castle on the hill, which now  houses the hotel Borgo Storico Seghetti Panichi.

References

Cities and towns in the Marche